Wan Jamak bin Wan Hassan (born 22 November 1957) is a Malaysian former footballer, currently working as the Head of Youth Development at Johor Darul Ta'zim FC since 2015.

Wan Jamak was a former football player for Johor FA and the Malaysian national team. In 1980, He also part of Malaysia squad in the AFC Asian Cup in Kuwait. He had also coached several team in the Malaysian domestic league, and also coached the Malaysia national football team.

Honours

As a Player

Johor 
 Malaysia Kings Gold Cup: 1979; runner up 1978

Malaysia 
 SEA Games: 1979
 Pestabola Merdeka: 1979

As a Manager

Negeri Sembilan 
 Malaysia FA Cup: 2010
 Malaysia Cup: 2009; runner-up 2010

Malaysia 
 AFF Championship: runner-up 1996

References

External links
 Wan Jamak Wan Hassan Soccerway Profile

1957 births
Living people
Malaysia international footballers
Malaysian footballers
Association football defenders
Johor Darul Ta'zim F.C. players
1980 AFC Asian Cup players
Malaysian football managers
People from Johor
Southeast Asian Games gold medalists for Malaysia
Southeast Asian Games medalists in football
Competitors at the 1979 Southeast Asian Games